The Ukrainian Premier League youth competitions is a complex of youth competitions within the Ukrainian Premier League and is part of youth competitions in Ukraine. The events include championship among two age categories under 19 and under 21 years old.

History

First steps

Soon after establishing the Professional Football League of Ukraine (PFL) in 1996, a discussion arose about developing younger generation of football players. In 1998 in Ukraine started competition of academies of football clubs which participate in competitions of PFL (Higher, First and Second leagues). In 2001 there was established a separate organization, Ukrainian Youth Football League, that took over administration of youth competitions. Originally, competitions were conducted in four age groups between 14 and 17. In 2002 in coordination with the PFL there was introduced competition among youth under 19 years of age.

Ukrainian Youth Football League championship among junior teams (Unofficial competitions)

Reserves competitions
In 2004 the PFL introduced competition among the Vyshcha Liha (Higher League) clubs' double teams (reserve teams). The reason for introduction of the Vyshcha Liha competitions among doubles was partly connected with necessity to free the PFL lower league competitions from the Higher League clubs' second teams. With introduction of the double competitions in 2004, professional clubs started to remove their second teams from the 2004-05 Ukrainian Second League and even more in the following season. The age restriction for the Vyshcha Liha double teams at first was conditional. In 2006 the PFL discontinued joint youth competition among under-19 teams conducted along with the Youth Football League.

Conversion of reserve competitions and addition of other UPL junior competitions
In 2008 there was established the Ukrainian Premier League which took the administration over the Higher League clubs' competitions including the competitions among doubles. Those competitions were renamed as the UPL championship and the UPL youth championship. The UPL youth competition became age restrictive and involved players of under-21 years of age. 

In 2012 now as part of the Ukrainian Premier League, there was reestablished competitions among under-19 teams. To avoid ambiguity, the UPL youth championship was renamed as the UPL U-21 championship, while the other competition received the name of UPL U-19 championship.

Plans of establishing separate professional junior league competitions
In 2016 the competitions among youth teams with age category under 19 years of age were reintroduced in the Professional Football League now for teams of the Persha Liha and Druha Liha (First and Second leagues), as well as amateur level youth football-oriented institutions, i.e. youth football clubs, sports schools. The competitions received the name of Persha Liha U-19 competitions. In 2017 discussions were taking place to expand the UPL to include competitions of the Persha Liha (First League) as well as the Persha Liha U-19 competitions and allowing exchange between Premier League and First League among the youth teams.

The UPL youth competitions are considered as a development league and therefore its participants' performance does not result in the team's relegation from it. The relegation occurs only based on their final league position of their respective senior teams in the Ukrainian Premier League. If the senior team is relegated from the Ukrainian Premier League, then its reserve team is relegated from the Premier Reserve League and replaced by a reserve team of another newly promoted club from the Ukrainian First League.

Laureates

Top League championship among reserve teams

Ukrainian Premier League youth's (U-21) championship

Top three

All-time table

Under-19 winners

Premier League junior (U-19) championship

Top three

All-time table

Notable players 

Syarhey Karnilenka
Oleksandr Aliyev
Roman Zozulya
Artem Hromov

See also 
Ukrainian Premier League
Football in Ukraine
Ukrainian football league system

References

External links
 Official website

 
Res
Reserve football leagues in Europe
Sports leagues established in 2004
2004 establishments in Ukraine
Youth football in Ukraine
Ukraine